The 1941 Campeonato Nacional de Fútbol Profesional was Chilean first tier’s 9th season. Colo-Colo was the tournament’s champion, winning its 3rd title.

Scores

Standings

Topscorer

References

External links
ANFP 
RSSSF Chile 1941

Primera División de Chile seasons
Primera
Chile